Bely Gorod ("White City") is the central core area of Moscow, Russia beyond the Kremlin and Kitay-gorod.

The name comes from the color of its defensive wall, which was erected in 1585–1593 at the behest of tsar Feodor I and Boris Godunov by architect Fyodor Kon'.

Bely Gorod had 28 towers and 11 gates, the names of some of which are still preserved in the names of squares, namely: Trehsvyatsky, Chertolsky (Prechistensky), Arbatsky, Nikitsky, Tversky, Petrovsky, Sretensky, Myasnitsky, Pokrovsky, Yauzskiy, Vasilievsky. The walls were cogged, like the Kremlin walls, with loopholes that allowed keeping a continuous fire.

During the reign of Catherine the Great and her grandson Alexander I the wall was demolished and replaced by a chain of boulevards, known as the Boulevard Ring.

External links
 Pile-Driving in the White City (Белый город)
 Белый Царев город
 Храмы Белого города

Geography of Moscow
16th century in Moscow
Cultural heritage monuments of federal significance in Moscow